Xinhua District is a core district of the city of Pingdingshan, Henan province, China.

Administrative divisions
As 2012, this district is divided to 10 subdistricts and 2 towns.
Subdistricts

Towns
Jiaodian
Zhiyang

References

County-level divisions of Henan
Pingdingshan